The Searchlight Experimental Establishment, or SLEE, was a Royal Engineers research group who studied the improvement of searchlights and other anti-aircraft systems like sound locators and predictors.

The SLEE initially formed up at Woolwich Common in 1917 during World War I as a small group within the Corps of London Electrical Engineers to research anti-aircraft artillery and searchlights. In 1919, they took over sound locator development and began the acoustic mirror program that stretched into the 1930s before it was replaced by radar.

In 1924 the group moved to RAF Biggin Hill and was renamed the Air Defence Experimental Establishment, or ADEE.

References
 

Military research establishments of the United Kingdom
20th-century military history of the United Kingdom